Skanssi (Finnish; Skansen in Swedish) is a district in the Uittamo-Skanssi ward of the city of Turku, in Finland. It is in the southeast of the city, and consists mostly of industrial areas.

The current population of Skanssi is 141, and it is increasing at an annual rate of 5.67%. 17.73% of the district's population are under 15 years old, while 22.70% are over 65. The district's linguistic makeup is 93.62% Finnish and 6.38% Swedish.

See also
Skanssi (shopping centre)
Districts of Turku
Districts of Turku by population

Districts of Turku